Pablo Ramírez is a Mexican Spanish-language sportscaster in the United States. Born in Sinaloa, Ramírez grew up in Jalisco, Mexico. Ramírez primarily provides Spanish-language commentary for football (soccer) matches. He is best known for working along with Jesus Bracamontes for the US-based Spanish-language TV station Univision until his departure in 2022. 

Nicknamed La Torre de Jalisco (the tower of Jalisco) due to his height, at 6'5"/196 cm.

Early career

During the early 1980s Ramírez played football as a goalkeeper for Atlético Tecomán in the Mexican Third Division, until a serious injury prevented him for playing football at a higher level. He also made a cameo appearance in the 2014 film Rio 2.

In 2023, Ramírez was named one of the Spanish-language commentators for Major League Soccer coverage on Apple TV.

References

External links

Pablo Ramírez on Univision
Pablo Ramirez profile at Univision

Association football commentators
Mexican sports journalists
People from Jalisco
Living people
Mexican emigrants to the United States
Year of birth missing (living people)